Alexandrovo-Maryino is a rural locality (a village) in Posyolok imeni Zhelyabovo, Ustyuzhensky District, Vologda Oblast, Russia. The population was 33 as of 2002.

Geography 
Matveyevo is the nearest rural locality.

References 

Rural localities in Ustyuzhensky District